Vilnohirsk is a city in Kamianske Raion, Dnipropetrovsk Oblast (province) of Ukraine. It hosts the administration of Vilnohirsk urban hromada, one of the hromadas of Ukraine. Population: . Population was 22,458 (2001).

Vilnohirsk is (with Irshansk) the centre of the Ukrainian titanium ore industry.

Until 18 July 2020, Vilnohirsk was designated as a city of oblast significance and did not belong to any raion. As part of the administrative reform of Ukraine, which reduced the number of raions of Dnipropetrovsk Oblast to seven, the city was merged into newly established Kamianske Raion.

References

Cities in Dnipropetrovsk Oblast
Populated places established in the Ukrainian Soviet Socialist Republic
New towns
Populated places established in 1956
1956 establishments in the Soviet Union
Cities of regional significance in Ukraine
Company towns in Ukraine